Schistura semiarmata is a species of stone loach in the genus Schistura. It is found in the Indian states of Karnataka, Kerala, and Tamil Nadu (the Bhavani River, the Seegoor River, and Billicul Lake) and, at least based on some sources, in Pakistan. It grows to  SL. It is a very common species inhabiting high altitude streams with hard bottom (sand, gravel and cobble stones as the major substrates). It is sometimes used as an aquarium fish.

References

S
Freshwater fish of India
Fish of Pakistan
Fish described in 1867
Taxa named by Francis Day
Taxobox binomials not recognized by IUCN